Victor Wong may refer to:

 Victor Wong (actor born 1927) (1927–2001)
 Victor Wong (actor born 1906) (1906–1972)
 Victor Wong (singer) (born 1972)